Campbell Hall School is an independent, coeducational, K–12 Episcopal day school located in the Studio City neighborhood of the city of Los Angeles, California, United States.  Founded in 1944 by the Reverend Alexander Campbell, the school has an enrollment of approximately 1,000 students from kindergarten through high school.  It has programs in athletics, music, drama, dance and all other major academic areas. The school features a developed Performing Arts Program. Students in kindergarten through grade twelve participate in dance, voice, instrumental and drama programs. Orchestra and a World Music Program are available for grades 7–12.

History 
The school opened in 1944 as a kindergarten to sixth grade school at the St. David's Parish Sunday School building at 4343 Radford Avenue in Studio City. It moved to its current site in the 1945–46 school year. It gradually expanded to include junior high school, a girls high school, and the acceptance of boys for all levels in the mid-1980s. The Fourth R, a film made in the late 1940s explains the founding of the school based on a need for religion in the daily education of the school's students. The chapel program continues this tradition. Since its founding, Campbell Hall School has had three headmasters: the Rev. Alexander Campbell, the founder; the Rev. Canon Thomas G. Clarke, who served in this position for 32 years and the current  headmaster, the Rev. Julian Bull.

Tuition 
Tuition for the 2019–2020 school year is $36,240 (Elementary School; Grades K–6), $41,895 (grades 7–11), and $42,525 as a Senior (grade 12).  Additional fees include $2,500 for admission processing assessed only once in each family's career at Campbell Hall. Fees include Yearbook, Parents’ Association, Technology, Tuition Guarantee Plan, Student Body Fee (grades 7–12), Graduation Fee (grade 12), and Books (grades K-6). For grades 7–12 books are ordered online; families are responsible for ordering and payment. Over $3,000,000 of Campbell Hall's $26,000,000 budget is dedicated to financial aid, although much of this is used to attract diversity and sports playing students. 25% of the enrolled students receive grants averaging 50% of the cost of tuition. The remaining money for financial aid comes from the school's endowment.

Notable alumni

Paul Thomas Anderson, director
Annalise Basso, actress
Simone Battle, singer
Troian Bellisario, actress
Max Burkholder, actor
Dakota Fanning, actress
Elle Fanning, actress
Colin Ford, actor
Aaron Holiday, basketball player
Jrue Holiday, basketball player
Justin Holiday, basketball player
Austin McBroom, basketball player, YouTuber
Ashley Olsen, actress, fashion designer
Elizabeth Olsen, actress
Mary-Kate Olsen, actress, fashion designer
Nick Robinson, actor
Michael Matteo Rossi, filmmaker
John David Washington, actor
Ariel Winter, actress

References

External links 

 

1944 establishments in California
Educational institutions established in 1944
Episcopal schools in the United States
High schools in Los Angeles County, California
High schools in the San Fernando Valley
Private elementary schools in California
Private high schools in California
Private middle schools in California
Studio City, Los Angeles